The following lists events that happened in 1990 in Iceland.

Incumbents
President – Vigdís Finnbogadóttir 
Prime Minister – Steingrímur Hermannsson

Events

Births

4 February – Karen Knútsdóttir, handball player
5 February – Ásta Guðrún Helgadóttir, politician
14 March – Kolbeinn Sigþórsson, footballer
30 March – Stella Sigurðardóttir, handball player
29 April – Kristinn Steindórsson, footballer.
13 May – Ólafur Guðmundsson, handball player
19 May – Stefán Rafn Sigurmannsson, handball player
29 May – Björn Daníel Sverrisson, footballer
4 August – Kristinn Jónsson, footballer
29 September – Sara Björk Gunnarsdóttir, footballer
16 October – Jóhanna Guðrún Jónsdóttir, singer
27 October – Jóhann Berg Guðmundsson, footballer

Full date missing
Sunneva Einarsdóttir, handball player

Deaths
1 September – Geir Hallgrímsson, politician (b. 1925).

1 September – Stefán Kristjánsson, alpine skier (b. 1924).

References

 
1990s in Iceland
Iceland
Iceland
Years of the 20th century in Iceland